Club Deportivo San Pedro Masahuat  is a Salvadoran professional football club based in San Pedro Masahuat, La Paz,  El Salvador.

The club currently plays in the Tercera Division de Fútbol Salvadoreño.

Football clubs in El Salvador